Bahadur Haziyev (born on 26 March 1999) is an Azerbaijani footballer who plays as a forward for Shamakhi in the Azerbaijan Premier League.

Club career
On 16 February 2020, Haziyev made his debut in the Azerbaijan Premier League for Sabail match against Gabala.

On 15 December 2022, Shamakhi announced that Haziyev had signed a new two-and-a-half year contract with the club.

Honours
MOIK Baku
 Azerbaijan First Division (1): 2018–19

References

External links
 

1999 births
Living people
Association football forwards
Azerbaijani footballers
Azerbaijan youth international footballers
Azerbaijan Premier League players
Sabail FK players